Angola competed at the 2000 Summer Olympics in Sydney, Australia.

Athletics

Men's marathon

Men
Track and road events

Women
Track and road events

Basketball

Men

Roster
 Victor Muzadi
 Anibal Moreira
 Angelo Victoriano
 Garcia Domingos
 Edmar Victoriano
 Victor Carvalho
 Herlander Coimbra
 Belarmino Mario Chipongue
 David Bartolomeu Dias
 Carlos Bendinha de Almeida
 Miguel Pontes Lutonda
 Buila Katiavala

Preliminary round

Classification Round

Handball

Women

Roster
 Ilda Bengue
 Regina Camumbila
 Domingas Cordeiro
 Maura Faial
 Maria Jololo
 Marcelina Kiala
 Ivone Mufuca
 Anica Neto
 Justina Praça
 Maria Raimundo
 Maria Tavares
 Filomena Trindade
 Teresa Ulundo
 Elisa Webba

Groupplay

Ninth place game

Shooting

Men

Swimming

Men

Women

See also
 Angola at the 2000 Summer Paralympics

References
Wallechinsky, David (2004). The Complete Book of the Summer Olympics (Athens 2004 Edition). Toronto, Canada. . 
International Olympic Committee (2001). The Results. Retrieved 12 November 2005.
Sydney Organising Committee for the Olympic Games (2001). Official Report of the XXVII Olympiad Volume 1: Preparing for the Games. Retrieved 20 November 2005.
Sydney Organising Committee for the Olympic Games (2001). Official Report of the XXVII Olympiad Volume 2: Celebrating the Games. Retrieved 20 November 2005.
Sydney Organising Committee for the Olympic Games (2001). The Results. Retrieved 20 November 2005.
International Olympic Committee Web Site

Nations at the 2000 Summer Olympics
2000
Olympics